This page summarizes projects that brought more than  of new liquid fuel capacity to market with the first production of fuel beginning in 2004.  This is part of the Wikipedia summary of Oil Megaprojects—see that page for further details.  2004 saw 24 projects come on stream with an aggregate capacity of  when full production was reached (which may not have been in 2004).

Quick Links to Other Years

Detailed Project Table for 2004 

See also the 2004 world oil market chronology

This table is available in csv format here (updated daily).

References

Oil megaprojects
Oil fields
Proposed energy projects
2004 in technology